The Fontys Academy of Journalism (Dutch: Fontys Hogeschool voor Journalistiek, short FHJ) is one of the four journalism schools in the Netherlands. It is based in Tilburg, North Brabant. Founded in 1980 as the Academy of Journalism and Public Relations, the school had a Catholic background in its early years, although students and teachers have always doubted the existence of Catholic journalism. Several years ago the school joined Fontys Hogescholen, a community of higher vocational schools in the south of the Netherlands, and was given its current name. The FHJ-building is located in the west of Tilburg, at the Gimbrerelaan.

The FHJ houses studios for radio and television, as well as a printing press for internal publications. Students can choose various majors, including audiovisual journalism, newspaper and magazine journalism and corporate journalism.

In 2005, the academy celebrated its 25th anniversary, organizing several conferences on the future of journalism in the Netherlands.

Journalism schools in Europe
Organisations based in North Brabant